The East Lancs Nordic is a type of low-floor double-decker bus body built by East Lancashire Coachbuilders. It is built on tri-axle double-decker Volvo B7L chassis, with a length of 12 metres and a seating capacity of 95 passengers. The Nordic body design is based on an elongated version of the East Lancs Vyking body, with the name "Nordic" being derived from the chassis being built by a company from Sweden. The bus was later superseded by the East Lancs Olympus tri-axle variant in 2006.

Operations

United Kingdom
First Glasgow were the only operator in the United Kingdom to purchase Nordics, taking delivery of ten examples in October and November 2002. These Nordics were replaced in 2009 by a batch of Alexander Dennis Enviro500s, and all ten Nordics were sold by First Glasgow, one to Tyrers Coaches and nine to BrightBus of Rotherham; however, one vehicle was destroyed by fire shortly after its arrival at BrightBus, and was stripped for spares and scrapped.

Following the closure of BrightBus, these have now moved on to other operators: four Nordics passed to the Wellglade Group (two to TM Travel of Sheffield and two to Notts & Derby), one immediately and three several months later via Ensignbus; four were passed on to school bus operator Cambridge Bus & Coach, 3 in the Summer of 2017, and 1 in the summer of 2018. They purchase another one in the summer of 2021

Denmark
The body was also sold outside of the UK, predominantly to operators in Denmark. Arriva Denmark took delivery of fourteen examples - at the time, their only double-deckers - for operations in and around Copenhagen under contract to HT (now HUR); some of these were later converted into open-top vehicles, while one has been destroyed by fire. Additionally, City Trafik of Copenhagen took delivery of 22 Nordics.

Sri Lanka
A total of 19 Nordics were delivered to operators in Sri Lanka, operating under contract to STLB.

Elsewhere
Thirteen of the former Arriva Denmark examples and fifteen of the Sri Lankan vehicles were later purchased by bus dealer Ensignbus and sold on to the Big Bus Company, who relocated the vehicles to their sightseeing operations in Sydney and Washington D.C.

Myllennium Nordic

The East Lancs Myllennium Nordic is a type of low-floor double-decker bus body built by East Lancashire Coachbuilders. It is built on tri-axle double-decker Volvo B9TL chassis, with a length of 12 metres and a seating capacity of 102 passengers. The Myllennium Nordic body design is based on an elongated version of the East Lancs Myllennium Vyking body, with the name "Nordic" being derived from the chassis being built by a company from Sweden. The Myllennium Nordic was introduced in 2005 as the replacement for the East Lancs Nordic; following poor sales, the Myllennium Nordic was later replaced by the introduction of a tri-axle variant of the Olympus.

Operations

United Kingdom
Weavaway Travel of Newbury were the largest customer for the Myllennium Nordic, taking delivery of the first six examples to be built in April and May 2005. Further examples were later purchased Roadliner of Poole and Provence Private Hire of St Albans.

Although they did not purchase any Myllennium Nordics from new, Sanders Coaches of North Norfolk now operate the majority of Myllennium Nordics built for the UK, having acquired them second-hand with Lucketts Travel of Fareham operates two under its 'Mortons' livery after buying them from Sanders Coaches.

Sri Lanka
Six Myllennium Nordics were exported for operations in Sri Lanka under contract to STLB. A seventh Myllennium Nordic caught fire prior to being exported in 2010 and was scrapped.

References

Double-decker buses
Low-floor buses
Tri-axle buses
Nordic
Vehicles introduced in 2000